Massimo Cenci (born 8 June 1967) is a politician of San Marino. He was Captain Regent of San Marino for the term from 1 April 2009 to October 2009 together with Oscar Mina.

Cenci was elected to the Grand and General Council on the Freedom List (Lista della Libertà). In 2005, he was one of the founders of the New Socialist Party.

References

1967 births
Living people
Captains Regent of San Marino
Members of the Grand and General Council
New Socialist Party (San Marino) politicians